Anvato was a  Mountain View, California-based technology firm. Founded in 2007 by Alper Turgut, it is a provider of cloud computing technologies for the online video industry, including online video editing, infrastructure, publishing, and monetization.

On July 8, 2016, Google announced that it had acquired Anvato; the company will be incorporated into the Google Cloud Platform suite.

References

External links 
 

American companies established in 2007
Companies based in Mountain View, California
Google acquisitions